John Trousdale Coffee (December 14, 1816 – May 23, 1890) was a Missouri politician, elected to the State Senate and then to the House, where he was elected as Speaker of the House (1856–1858).  During the American Civil War, he served as a Confederate officer in Missouri. In the late war, he moved to Waco, Texas, and later lived in Georgetown, where he practiced law again.  He had a total of four wives and thirteen children.

Early life
Coffee was born in Smith County, Tennessee where he taught himself law and was admitted to the bar. He moved to Springfield, Missouri in 1842 following the deaths of his father and first wife.

Marriage and family
Coffee married his first wife in Tennessee. After her death in 1842, he migrated to Missouri, where he married again.

His second wife died in 1845, two weeks after childbirth. That year in September, he married for the third time. By the end of the Civil War, when they had moved to Waco, Texas, he had a total of seven children. After his wife's death, he moved with his family to Georgetown, Texas.

There he married for the fourth time. With his young wife, he had six more children.

Career
Coffee practiced law in Springfield and Bolivar, Missouri.

He raised an army unit to participate in the Mexican–American War (1846–1848), but the war ended while they were en route to New Orleans.

Politician
Coffee returned to Missouri in 1849, where he was elected as the circuit attorney for Dade County. He lived in Greenfield.

In 1854 he was elected to the Missouri State Senate. He resigned in 1855 to accept a captain position with the First U.S. Army Cavalry Regiment at Fort Leavenworth, Kansas. After serving only four months, he resigned the captain position due to illness and returned to Greenfield.

In 1856 he argued to allow "squatter sovereignty" to solve the Bleeding Kansas problem (the argument was that Missourians should be allowed to vote deciding whether Kansas should be a slave state and they could do that by claiming land in Kansas). In 1857 he was a publisher of the Greenfield Southwest newspaper.

In 1858 Coffee ran again for the Missouri Senate but lost in the Democratic primary to B.H. Cravens. He ran for the Missouri House of Representatives and was elected Speaker of the Missouri House of Representatives in his first term. In 1860 he lost a Democratic primary for Missouri Secretary of State and returned to law practice.

Missouri militia
With the beginning of the American Civil War, Coffee raised a regiment in Dade County and was commissioned as a colonel in the Confederate Army. After Sterling Price retreated from Missouri, Coffee stayed in the state.  He harassed Union troops in skirmishes around Neosho, Missouri. One of his most famous skirmishes was the Battle of Lone Jack.

Coffee's troops were routed by Union troops on August 12, 1863 at Pineville when 60-70 of his men were killed. In October 1863 Coffee's troops captured the Union garrison in his hometown of Greenfield and burned the courthouse. Among the destroyed records was his land deed, which caused him to lose his land claim in Missouri.

After the Pineville conflict, Coffee was passed over for promotion for General Joseph O. Shelby, who was given command of Missouri forces. Coffee left for Arkansas, where he attempted unsuccessfully to recruit a new regiment. In late 1864 or early 1865, he moved to Waco, Texas with his large family.

Post-Civil War
After the surrender of the Confederates, Coffee refused a request by Shelby to continue the fight under the flag of Emperor Maximilian of Mexico. He formally surrendered to George Armstrong Custer on July 26, 1865 in Austin, Texas.

He died in Georgetown, Texas.

References

1816 births
1890 deaths
People from Smith County, Tennessee
People from Springfield, Missouri
Confederate States Army officers
Democratic Party Missouri state senators
Speakers of the Missouri House of Representatives
Democratic Party members of the Missouri House of Representatives
Shelby's Iron Brigade
19th-century American politicians
People from Greenfield, Missouri
People from Georgetown, Texas
Military personnel from Texas